The lined silverside (Atherinomorus lineatus) is a species of fish in the family Atherinidae. It is found in Indonesia and the Philippines. This species was described as Atherina lineata by Albert Günther in 1872 with the type locality given as Cebu.

Sources 

Atherinomorus
Fish described in 1872
Taxa named by Albert Günther
Taxonomy articles created by Polbot